Isabela, officially the Province of Isabela, is the second largest province in the Philippines in land area located in the Cagayan Valley region. Its capital and the largest local government unit is the city of Ilagan. It is bordered by the provinces of Cagayan to the north, Kalinga to the northwest, Mountain Province to the central-west, Ifugao and Nueva Vizcaya to the southwest, Quirino and Aurora to the south, and the Philippine Sea to the east.

This primarily agricultural province is the rice and corn granary of Luzon due to its plain and rolling terrain. In 2012, the province was declared as the country's top producer of corn with 1,209,524 metric tons. Isabela was also declared the second-largest rice producer in the Philippines and the Queen Province of the North.

Isabela is the 9th richest province in the Philippines as of 2021. The province has four trade centers in the cities of Ilagan, Cauayan, Santiago and the municipality of Roxas. Santiago City is considered to have the fastest-growing local economy in the entire Philippines.

Etymology
The province was named after Isabella II, who was queen regnant of Spain from September 29, 1833, until September 30, 1868, when she was deposed in the Glorious Revolution, and her formal abdication two years later.

There have been proposals to change the name to something more indigenous, but these were rejected by the people of Isabela.

History
The province of Isabela used to be a vast rainforest where numerous indigenous ethnolinguistic groups lived. Many of the same ethnic groups still live in the province. Shell midden sites and other archaeological sites throughout the province constitute the material culture of those groups during the classical era.

Spanish colonial period 

During the Spanish era, prior to 1856, the Cagayan Valley was divided into only two provinces: Cagayan and Nueva Vizcaya. The Province of Cagayan at that time consisted of all towns from Tumauini to Aparri in the north. All other towns from Ilagan southward to Aritao comprised the Province of the old Nueva Vizcaya. In order to facilitate the work of the Catholic missionaries in the evangelization of the Cagayan Valley, a royal decree was issued on May 1, 1856, creating the Province of Isabela consisting of the towns of Gamu, Old Angadanan (now Alicia), Bindang (now Roxas) and Camarag (now Echague), Carig (now Santiago City) and Palanan, all detached from the Province of Nueva Vizcaya; while Cabagan and Tumauini were taken from the Province of Cagayan.

The province was placed under the jurisdiction of a governor (Lieutenant Colonel of Cavalry Francisco Contreras y Urtasun) with Ilagan as the capital, where it remains up to present. It was initially called Isabela de Luzón to differentiate from other places in the Philippines bearing the name of Isabela. The new province was named after Queen Isabella II of Spain.

American era 

Although the province did not play a major role in the revolt against Spain, it is in Palanan that the final pages of the Philippine Revolution were written when United States troops, led by General Frederick Funston, finally captured General Emilio Aguinaldo in the area on March 23, 1901. To commemorate this historical event, Dr. Philip S. Chua, MD, FACS, FPCS (now a cardiac surgeon in Las Vegas, Nevada, and Munster, Indiana, USA) then a 26-year-old medical missionary volunteer to the Work-A-Year-With-The-People's project of then Senator Raul S. Manglapus, Manuel Quezon Jr., and Ramon Magsaysay Jr., in 1962, while ministering to the health needs of the people in Palanan in his medical office at the Carmelite Convent, succeeded in convincing the town officials to construct a marker, a monument by the Palanan City Hall, right on the spot where General Aguinaldo was captured, to memorialize the historical event. The monument was inaugurated on June 12, 1962, Philippine Independence Day, and still stands today.

Isabela was re-organized as a province under the American military government through Act No. 210, passed August 24, 1901.

The Americans built schools and other buildings and instituted changes in the overall political system. However, the province's economy remained particularly agricultural with rice replacing corn and tobacco as the dominant crop. World War II stagnated the province's economic growth but it recovered dramatically after the war. In 1942, Imperial Japanese occupied Isabela. In 1945, the liberation of Isabela commenced with the arrival of the Philippine Commonwealth troops under the Philippine Army, Constabulary, and USAFIP-NL units and recognized guerrillas attacked by the Japanese Imperial forces in World War II.

A new wave of immigration began in the late 19th and 20th centuries with the arrival of the Ilokano who came in large numbers. They now constitute the largest group in the province, and it was only in this large-scale Ilocano immigration & settlement that made Ilocano language replaced Ibanag as the lingua franca of the province. Other ethnic groups followed that made Isabela the "Melting Pot of the Northern Philippines".

Independent era 
In the years after the Second World War , Isabela was ruled by the Dy family for 35 years (1969-2004). The dynasty was started by the patriarch of the family, Faustino N. Dy Sr., who served as the Mayor of Cauayan from 1965 to 1969 and sat as provincial governor for 22 years (1969–1992), surviving the initial attempts of President Ferdinand Marcos to remove him for being a member of the political opposition during the imposition of Martial Law in 1972 and winning reelection in 1988 after his removal by President Corazon Aquino after he had sided with Marcos in 1986. 

During the Marcos era era, Isabela became one of the first strongholds of the New People's Army, with events such as the discovery of the Taringsing Documents in Cordon outlining plans for a communist takeover and the botched landing of arms bound for the NPA in Palanan during the MV Karagatan incident in 1972 being cited as one of the justifications for the declaration of Martial Law by Marcos that year. 

It was also during the dictatorship that  Marcos began awarding logging concessions to his cronies in the areas of the Sierra Madre region, which heralded the beginning of widescale deforestation and other environmental problems that affect the province since then, despite Marcos creating the Palanan Wilderness Area in 1978 which was later expanded by President Fidel V. Ramos to become the Northern Sierra Madre Natural Park in 1997.  

In 1975, construction began on the Magat Dam on the boundary of Ramon, Isabela with neighboring Ifugao Province, becoming a catchbasin for 8 rivers upstream in Ifugao and serving multiple functions, including: irrigating of agricultural lands; flood control; and power generation.  The construction was protested by the Ifugao people due to the flooding of their ancestral lands, but the dam was eventually completed in 1982, partially funded through a loan from the World Bank.

Around 1987, former mayor of Santiago, Mayor Dodo Miranda planned to run as governor of Isabela but was ambushed by an unidentified gunman in Reina Mercedes. The reason Santiago City is independent from Isabela was because of that incident. On May 5, 1994, President Fidel V. Ramos signed Republic Act 7720, making Santiago the first city in Cagayan Valley. This was followed in 2001 by Cauayan, which attained component cityhood by virtue of Republic Act 9017 signed by President Gloria Macapagal-Arroyo on February 28, 2001, and ratified in a plebiscite on March 30 of that year.

Dy Sr. was succeeded by his son, Benjamin G. Dy, in the gubernatorial seat from 1992 to 2001. Another Dy took over the gubernatorial seat in 2001 when Faustino Dy Jr. won the 2001 elections after having served as the district representative of the 2nd Legislative District of the province from 1992 to 2001. It was only in the 2004 elections that the family's control of the gubernatorial seat ended when Grace Padaca, a former journalist, won over Faustino Dy Jr. She was the first woman to serve as the governor of the province. After serving for six years (2004-2010), Padaca was defeated in the 2010 National Elections by Faustino "Bojie" G. Dy III who served as governor of the province for three consecutive terms (2010-2019). He was then succeeded by Rodolfo "Rodito" Albano III, a member of the Albano dynasty that dominates Isabela's 1st congressional district.

In 1995, Republic Act 7891 was passed, legislating that Isabela be divided into two new provinces: Isabela del Norte and Isabela del Sur. A referendum was held on the same year with a slight majority voting against partitioning the province.

In 2012, the capital town of Ilagan officially became a city, after the move gained 96% of the votes in the plebiscite conducted on August 11, 2012. The night after the plebiscite, Ilagan was declared as a component city of the province.

Geography
It is the largest province in the island of Luzon and the second largest province in the Philippines by land area. Occupying the central section of the Cagayan Valley region in Luzon, Isabela is bordered by Cagayan to the north, Kalinga to the northwest, Mountain Province to the central-west, Ifugao and Nueva Vizcaya to the southwest, Quirino to the south, and Aurora to the south. To the east lies the Philippine Sea, making Isabela one of the typhoon-prone provinces in the country.

The province is divided into three physiographic areas. The eastern area, straddled by the Sierra Madre mountain range, is rugged and thickly forested. A substantial portion is uncharted. These unexplored hinterlands are home to a rich variety of flora and fauna, and some are under government reservations. It is home to one of the world's largest remaining low-altitude rainforests, with numerous unknown endemic species of flora and fauna and biological diversity in the protected area known as the Northern Sierra Madre Natural Park. Isabela has  of Cagayan Valley’s  of forest cover.

The highest point of the province is located near the border with Cagayan. Mount Dos Cuernos peak has an elevation of  located in San Pablo near the border with Maconacon.

The western area is a fertile valley hemmed by the Central Cordillera. It is crisscrossed by the mighty Cagayan River, Siffu River, and Magat River.

Mallig Plains region

Mallig Plains is a region in the western section of the province. Its name was derived from the rolling terrains or kilometers of plain lands in western part of Isabela. The municipality of Roxas serves as the business center of the region. The Plains encompassing the municipalities of Quezon, Mallig, Quirino, Burgos, Aurora, San Manuel and Roxas.

Administrative divisions

Isabela is politically subdivided into thirty-four (34) municipalities, two component cities and one independent component city. The province is represented in the Philippine House of Representatives with six legislative districts.

The province has ten first class municipalities, two second class cities and one first class independent component city. Ilagan City, which became a city thirteen years after its failed cityhood proposal in 1998, it is now Luzon’s largest and the country’s fourth biggest city after Davao City, Puerto Princesa and Zamboanga City by land area.

Barangays
The 34 municipalities and 3 cities of the province comprise 1,055 barangays, with Rizal in Santiago City as the most populous in 2010, and Catalina in Cauayan as the least. If cities are excluded, Bugallon Proper (Poblacion) in Ramon has the highest population, and Uauang-Tuliao in Santo Tomas has the lowest.

Government

Governors

After Isabela was re-organized as a province under the American regime in 1901, its first provincial governor was Rafael Maramag, a former Municipal President and also the first Municipal President of the capital town Ilagan. He was succeeded by his brother, Gabriel. Since 1969, the position has been occupied mostly by members of the Dy family, a political dynasty based in Cauayan that has expanded to neighboring municipalities. The current governor is Rodolfo "Rodito" Albano III, a member of the Albano dynasty that dominates Isabela's 1st congressional district and is an ally of the Dys.

Legislative districts
On September 27, 2018, Republic Act No. 11080, an act reapportioning the province of Isabela into six legislative districts from four, was signed into law and the reapportioned districts elected its representatives starting in the 2019 midterm elections. Accordingly, the six districts are as follows:

First District: Cabagan, Delfin Albano, Divilacan, Ilagan City, Maconacon, San Pablo, Santa Maria, Santo Tomas and Tumauini.
Second District: Benito Soliven, Gamu, Naguilian, Palanan, Reina Mercedes and San Mariano.
Third District: Alicia, Angadanan, Cabatuan, Ramon and San Mateo.
Fourth District: Cordon, Dinapigue, Jones, Santiago City and San Agustin.
Fifth District: Aurora, Burgos, Luna, Mallig, Quezon, Quirino, Roxas and San Manuel.
Sixth District: Cauayan, Echague, San Guillermo and San Isidro.

Demographics

The population of Isabela in the 2020 census was 1,697,050 people, making it the most populated province among the five provinces in Cagayan Valley (Region II).

In 2010, Isabela had a population of 1,489,645 people: 46 percent of the 3.2 million people in the region at that time. At the national level, the province contributed 1.58 percent to the total population of 88.57 million. There were 254,928 households in the province in 2007.

For all ages, the sex ratio in Isabela was about 105 with 660,627 males and 626,948 females in the 2000 Census of Population and Housing (Census 2000). There are more males than females below 50 years old.

Ilocanos are the most prominent group in the province. Of the total household population, 68.71 percent classified themselves as Ilocanos, followed by the Ibanags (14.05 percent), and Tagalogs (10.02 percent). The majority ethnic group were the Ibanags, who were first seen by the Spanish explorers and converted to Christianity by missionaries, the reason why the Ibanag language had spread throughout the valley region prior to the arrival of the migrating Ilocanos. The remaining 7.22 percent are either Gaddang, Paranan, Yogad, or from other ethnic groups who have assimilated into the Ibanag-Ilocano culture. More recently, a new group from the south, the Muslim Filipinos, have migrated to this province and have made a community for themselves. In addition to this, Tagalog-speaking peoples from Central Luzon (mostly from Nueva Ecija and Aurora) and Southern Luzon have also settled in the area, as well as a few Pangasinans and Kapampangans from the Central Luzon.

Major languages spoken are Ilocano followed by Ibanag, Yogad, and Gaddang. Ilocanos and Ibanags speak Ilocano with an Ibanag accent, as descendants of Ilocanos from first generation in Isabela who lived within Ibanag population learned Ibanag; same situation with Ilocano tinged by Gaddang, Paranan, Yogad, and Itawis accents when descendants of Ilocanos from first generation in Isabela who lived within Gaddang, Paranan, Yogad, and Itawis populations learned their languages. People especially in the capital and commercial centers speak and understand English and Tagalog. Tagalogs, Ilocanos, and Ibanags speak Tagalog with an Ibanag accent, as descendants of Tagalogs from first generation in Isabela who lived within Ibanag population learned Ibanag.

Religion
Roman Catholicism is the predominant faith followed by about 80% of the people. Other religions practiced are Aglipayan, United Methodist Church and various Christian churches such as the Church of Jesus Christ of Latter-day Saints, Iglesia ni Cristo,and Protestant Churches Baptist, Seventh-day Adventist, other Charismatic Christians and Jehovah's Witnesses. There are also small number of Muslims.

Economy

In terms of income classification, Isabela is rated as first-class province and considered among the richest and most progressive province in the Philippines and the most progressive in Region 02 courtesy of the three key cities strategically located in the province.

Trade and industry

Strategically located at the center of Cagayan Valley region, Isabela is acknowledged to have demonstrated strengths in business and industry. Thus, it has come to be known as the Regional Trade and Industrial Center of north-eastern Luzon.

The province of Isabela is the richest in Cagayan Valley. It is also the 9th Richest Province in the Philippines last 2021.

The cities of Cauayan, Ilagan, Santiago and the town of Roxas are the principal commercial centers of the province. Metro Manila-based malls and fast food chains have recently opened in these key trading hubs. To date, 192 banking branches operate in the province, with most of the universal and commercial banks providing automated teller machines for the convenience of their clients.

Since the start of the 21st century, a growing number of foreign and local investors have selected Isabela as site of their business ventures. Heading the list are Isabela's top investors, namely: Mindanao Grains Processing Company, Inc., SN Aboitiz Power- Magat Inc., Universal Leaf Philippines, Coca-Cola Bottlers Philippines, Inc., San Miguel Corporation, RC Cola and Pepsi Cola.

In the rice industry, substantial investments have been made by Valiant Rice Mills Corporation, Family Choice Grains Processing Center, Golden Season Grains Center, Herco Agro Industries, JDT Silver Grains Center, New Cauayan Goldyluck Grains and the La Suerte Rice Mill Corporation.

Retail giants like SM Prime, Robinsons and Puregold Price Club, Inc. have set up shops like Savemore, Robinsons Supermarket and Puregold, respectively. In 2014, these retail companies opened its pioneer malls in the region, the SM City Cauayan and Robinsons Place Santiago.

Land transportation operators Victory Liner, Five Star Bus Company, Dalin Liner, GV Florida Transport, EMC Transportation, Inc., Solid North Transit Inc., and Northern Luzon Bus Company (NELBUSCO) have terminals and depots in the province.

Leading car, motorcycle and truck manufacturers such as Honda, Toyota, Mitsubishi Motors, Isuzu Motors, Kia Motors, Nissan, Ford, Chevrolet, Suzuki, Hyundai, Mazda, Geely Philippines, Foton, Peugeot, MAN SE, Yamaha and many other companies entered the province over the past years.

Telecom firms Globe, PLDT/Smart and Dito Telecommunity operate cellular sites and fixed telephony facilities throughout Isabela.

Big real estate developers like Vista Land and Lifescapes, Inc. entered the province with the opening of Camella Isabela, Camella Santiago, Camella Santiago Trails and Lessandra Santiago in Santiago City, and Camella Cauayan and Lumina Isabela in Cauayan. Vista Malls is set to launch its first high end mall in Santiago City.

Agriculture

Agriculture is the biggest industry in Isabela. As the country's top corn producing province, it contributes 13.02% of the annual national yellow corn production. Asia's largest post-harvest corn processing facility, the Mindanao Grains, is located in the town of Reina Mercedes.

As second highest rice-growing province nationwide, Isabela produces 15% of the aggregate national rice production on an annual basis. Being a surplus producer of the Filipinos’ staple crop, the province's rice sufficiency rate is at 224%, which means that Isabelinos produce more than they consume and are in fact responsible for supplying the rice requirements of Metro Manila and many other provinces. The unprecedented increase in palay production of Isabela made the province the Hybrid Rice Champion of the Philippines.

High-value agricultural crops grown in Isabela include monggo, tobacco, coffee, banana, and mango. Its livestock and poultry industries are also on the rise, especially dairy processing, hog production, cattle breeding, and commercial poultry raising.

Farming is highly mechanized as most of the agricultural lands are irrigated. With the presence of the Isabela State University, joint ventures and other foreign assisted projects and the Magat Dam contribute to the high productivity in agriculture. It is also the hub of trade and commerce and other economic activities due to its central location in the region. The wood industry used to be a top earner for the province but due to the logging ban imposed in the Cagayan Valley Region, activities in this industry considerably declined. However, furniture making using narra wood and other indigenous forest materials continue to exist.

Isabela is one of the most progressive provinces of the Philippines having been adjudged as the most outstanding province on food security in the Gawad Sapat Ani Awards 2000. For corn production, Isabela ranks first among the top ten corn producing provinces for cy 2004, contributing 15.70% to national production. In 2013, the Department of Agriculture declared Isabela as the Best Corn-Quality Awardee. Ilagan City was proclaimed as the Corn Capital of the Philippines for being the top corn producer among the 34 municipalities and 2 cities of the province as well as in the whole country.

Forestland

The best quality of timber resources in the Philippines are found in Isabela's forests. Isabela's vast forest resources are now being ecologically managed to effect sustainable forest-based resource not only for the wood working industry but to secure a balanced ecosystem. The woodwork industry continues to operate under a regulated system, particularly the making of furniture using indigenous materials.

Fisheries

Isabela has a fertile fishing ground on the Pacific Coast. The Magat Dam reservoir is utilized for fish cage operations for tilapia production for domestic markets. Another thriving industry in the province is aquaculture, sustained by inland fishing through 1,108 hectares of developed freshwater fishponds and 450 hectares of fish cage culture at Magat Dam Reservoir. There are 238 marine fish species that were identified by the Bureau of Fisheries and Aquatic Resources in Isabela's coastal seaboard municipalities of Maconacon, Divilacan, Palanan, and Dinapigue.

Mineral and energy
Large deposits of copper, gold, zinc and chromite, manganese and nickel have been found in Isabela. It also has extensive deposits of non-metallic minerals such as limestone, clay, marbles, guano, sand and gravel, and boulders. Indigenous energy sources such as natural gas and hydroelectric capabilities have been found to be abundant in the valley. Many of its mineral reserves have yet to be fully tapped.

Power

Solar and biomass power plants in the city of Cauayan and in the town of Alicia have started operating in 2015 to supplement the region's high energy demand. The online solar power plant in Cauayan is capable of supplying at least 20 megawatts while the biomass power plant in Alicia can produce another 20 megawatts. Both systems provide clean and renewable energy. The P2 billion power facility established by the Isabela Biomass Energy Corporation (IBEC) was built to augment power supply in the Cagayan Valley region. The use of biomass as fuel makes the power plant carbon neutral and sustainable. This biomass power facility is the first in the region and is designed to provide economical source of energy as well as job opportunities to residents of the host town/city.

On 27 May 2015, the service contract of the largest solar PV power plant in the country has been approved by the Department of Energy (DOE). The P7-billion worth 100 MW Solar PV project in the city of Ilagan is designed to reduce the current shortage of electricity that causes regular blackouts that results to industry closures as well as inconvenience to the consumers. The solar power facility will be constructed at a 100-hectare land at Barangay Cabannungan, several kilometers away from the city proper.

In December 2022, the Department of Energy (DOE) has given the go signal to a Filipino-French joint venture to develop one of the biggest renewable energy projects in the Philippines - an P18-billion solar farm in Ilagan City. The project will be undertaken by San Ignacio Energy Resources Development Corporation, which is part of the Nextnorth Energy Group developing over 450 megawatts of solar and hydro projects in Northern Luzon, and French firm Total Eren S.A. The project will involve the development of a 440 MWp/336 MWac solar PV project to be built on around 400 hectares of available land located along the Northern Luzon high voltage transmission network of the National Grid Corporation of the Philippines (NGCP). The project is scheduled to start construction in 2024 and start feeding electricity into the grid in 2025.

Transportation 

Isabela is accessible by all means of transportation. Almost 180-kilometers of the Pan-Philippine Highway pass through the different towns and cities of the province. Several bus companies offer daily trips to different routes like Manila, Dagupan, Baguio, Ilocos, and vice versa. Public utility vans and small-time bus operators ply daily trips from Tuguegarao in Cagayan to Santiago City vice versa, while jeepneys and tricycles are commonly used as the basic mode of transportation within the province's jurisdiction.

Ilagan-Divilacan Road
The construction of an 82-kilometer route across the Sierra Madre National Park is intended to improve access to the province's three coastal communities. The project's authorized budget contract, worth P1.5 billion, will traverse across the foothills of the Northern Sierra Madre mountain ranges, which cover 359,486 hectares. The idea is to rehabilitate an ancient logging route that was utilized until the 1990s by a defunct logging firm. It will begin in Barangay Sindon Bayabo in Ilagan City and end at Barangay Dicatian in Divilacan's seaside town. The project is scheduled to conclude in 2021.

The secluded coastal settlements of Divilacan, Palanan, and Maconacon are frequently accessible only by boat or plane, making them difficult to reach at times of emergencies and calamities. There are no highways connecting Ilagan's capital city to the coastal districts, denying locals access to basic commodities and social services such as health care. Once completed, the route is projected to bolster coastal economies, citing Divilacan's 119-hectare beach and freshwater areas that have attracted tourists. Resolution No. 11 of the Protected Area Management Board (PAMB) reclassifies areas of the Sierra Madre as a special-use zone. Additionally, the Agta and Dumagat communities in the vicinity have signed a memorandum of understanding with the provincial administration expressing their support for the road project. At least 1,800 Agta and Dumagat have made their homes in park areas. However, the road's impact on the protected forest has upset neighbors, who believe the project will harm the region's woods and ecosystems. The project has been delayed in recent years due to worries about the road's possible environmental impact. The Cagayan Valley Regional Development Council required that the road's proponents conduct a comprehensive analysis of the road's impact on the area's biodiversity.

Airports and sea ports

There are three airports in the province. The Cauayan Airport is the primary airport in the province serving a trip to Manila, Palanan, and Maconacon. The other two are the Palanan Airport in Palanan and Maconacon Airport in Maconacon. The country's leading passenger airline Cebu Pacific services the Cauayan-Manila-Cauayan Route. Light planes operated by Cyclone Airways and WCC Aviation's Sky Pasada Have flights from Cauayan Domestic Airport to the community airports in Palanan and Maconacon. The province has two minor seaports, the Divilacan Port and Palanan Port in the coastal towns of Divilacan and Palanan. The trade going to the ports comes primarily from major seaports in Cagayan such as Port of Aparri in Aparri, Cagayan, and Port of San Vicente and Port Irene, both in Santa Ana, Cagayan. The other two airstrips are found in Divilacan, and in Magat River Management Project Site.

Education
Isabela is one of the primary centers of education in the Cagayan Valley Region. There are several public and private educational institutions, the most notable being the Isabela State University, a government-owned and controlled public university. Its main campus is located in Echague and satellite campuses in Cauayan, Ilagan City, Angadanan, Cabagan, Jones, Palanan (extension), Roxas, San Mariano, San Mateo and Santiago City (extension).

Colleges and universities

Among the most notable higher educational institutions found in the province of Isabela are the following:

AMA Computer College (City of Santiago Campus)
 Cagayan Valley Computer and Information Technology College, Inc. (City of Santiago Campus)
 East Asia International System College (City of Cauayan Campus)
 Honorato Guzman Baquiran College (HGB College; Tumauini Campus)
 International Technological Institute of Arts and Tourism (City of Ilagan Campus)
Isabela State University (Angadanan Campus)
 Isabela State University (Echague; Main Campus)
 Isabela State University (Cabagan Campus)
 Isabela State University (City of Cauayan Campus)
 Isabela State University (Jones Campus)
 Isabela State University (City of Ilagan Campus)
 Isabela State University (Roxas Campus)
 Isabela State University (San Mariano Campus)
 Isabela State University (San Mateo Campus)
Isabela State University (Palanan Extension Campus)
Isabela State University (City of Santiago Extension Campus)
 Isabela College of Arts and Technology (City of Cauayan Campus)
 Mallig Plains Colleges (Mallig Campus)
 National Police College Regional Training School (City of Cauayan Campus)
 Northeastern College (City of Santiago Campus)
 Northeast Luzon Adventist College (Alicia Campus)
 Our Lady of the Pillar College (City of Cauayan Campus)
 Our Lady of the Pillar College (San Manuel Campus)
 La Patria College (City of Santiago Campus)
 Philippine Normal University (Alicia, Isabela Campus)
 Saint Clare College of Region 2 (City of Cauayan Campus)
 Saint Ferdinand College (Cabagan Satellite Campus)
 Saint Ferdinand College (City of Ilagan; Main Campus)
 Santiago City Colleges
 Santiago City Polytechnic College
 STI College (City of Cauayan Campus)
 Technical Education and Skills Development Authority (City of Ilagan; TESDA Accredited Competency Assessment Center)
 University of La Salette (City of Santiago Campus)
 University of Perpetual Help System (City of Cauayan, Isabela Campus)

Tourism 
Since the early 2000s, tourism has become an income-generating industry for Isabela. New hotels and resorts have opened, mostly in the cities of Ilagan, Cauayan and Santiago, and the towns of Tumauini, Gamu, Roxas, Alicia, Burgos, Ramon, San Mariano and Cordon. Top tourist attractions are the centuries-old churches; Magat Dam Tourism Complex, which houses Southeast Asia's biggest dam; Santa Victoria Caves, Pinzal Falls and Ilagan Sanctuary at Fuyot National Park; the white sand beaches in the coastal municipalities of Maconacon, Divilacan, Palanan, Dinapigue and islands of coastal Isabela; the world's biggest wooden lounge chair or butaka in Ilagan City; and various festivals and fiestas, including the Bambanti Festival annually celebrated every February, and the commemoration of the birth of the province during Isabela Day every May.

Places of interest

Churches

 San Pablo Church in San Pablo, the oldest town of Isabela founded by Padre de Santo Tomas on November 30, 1646 (about 210 years before Isabela was made a province). Its six-level bell tower including the circular apex is made of adobe. It is said to be the oldest in Isabela and the tallest in Cagayan Valley. 
 Saint Rose of Lima Church in Gamu is known for its Spanish architectural design. Built in 1726 during the Spanish time, the church façade was made of layered bricks and stones dating back during the 17th century and considered a pilgrimage church because of its antiquity. The feast of their patron, Saint Rose of Lima is celebrated every August 23. 
 Parish Church of St. Mathias in Tumauini was first built of light materials by Fray Francisco Muńez, O.P., and dedicated to Patron Saint Matthias, 1707. Separated from Cabagan and became regular parish, 1751. The church of stone with a unique cylindrical bell tower. The only of its kind in the Philippines was constructed by Father Domingo Forto in 1783 and completed, 1805. The town became the capital of Isabela for a short time in the 1890s. It is an ultra-baroque church unique for its extensive use of baked clay both for wall finishing and ornamentation and bears Chinese ancestry. Partly damage during World War II and repaired into its original form by the faithful of Tumauini. This church was declared as a National Cultural Treasure on February 24, 1989.  
 Our Lady of Atocha in Alicia was originally built by the Spaniards in the 18th century. Passing by Angadanan on February 12, 1805, Fr. Manuel Mora, OP wrote that "Angadanan has a convent of bricks, though not totally finished. Its church is timber, wood, and bamboo. The number of inhabitants is 791." The church and convent as seen today in the town of Alicia, was built by Fr. Tomas Calderon, OP and inaugurated in 1849, with Fr. Francisco Gainza, OP, then vicar of Carig (now Santiago City). The church was dedicated to the Nuestra Señora de Atocha, more popularly known today as Our Lady of Atocha. The church is known for its antique Castilian architectural design and can be found along the Maharlika Highway and is accessible by land transport. 
 Our Lady of the Pillar Parish Church in Cauayan was constructed by Fray Juan Prieto with the first class materials with galvanized roofing and a ceiling of bricks, dedicated to Nuestra Señora del Pilar. It had a tower which was later destroyed by a violent earthquake. Now, only the façade of the Cauayan Church remains in its original form. The original belfry is in ruins while a new nave and belfry was constructed and like the St. Mathias Church in the town of Tumauini, the facade has much interesting bas relief and portions of the bricks have numbers and symbols etched on it.
 Saint Ferdinand Parish Church (Ilagan City) — This church can't be seen on the highways or the main national road as it was located in the center of the city of Ilagan. The church features very high ceilings and walls made of bricks. It was around 1696 and 1700 that Fr. Miguel Matos, OP, built the church of stone and bricks. A typhoon in 1866 destroyed the roof of the church. Desiring to make the church bigger, Fr. Pablo Almazan, OP, demolished the solid walls of the church, which, unfortunately, was never built. The walls of the church today are of modern make. It is known to house one of the oldest bells in the region. The church is dedicated to the patron saint of the Diocese of Ilagan, San Fernando. 
 National Shrine of Our Lady of the Visitation of Guibang is located in town of Gamu, frequented by travelers passing by the Maharlika Highway. It comes alive every year on the month July when religious pilgrims visit to offer prayers during its feast day. The image of the Our Lady of the Visitation was canonically crowned by the Most Rev. Carmine Pocco, Papal Nuncio to the Philippines on May 26, 1973, at the former St. Ferdinand Cathedral (now St. Ferdinand Parish Church) in Ilagan City. The Catholic Bishops Conference of the Philippines at its 52nd Annual Bishop's Meeting held in Tagaytay on January 24–26, 1986 have approved the petition of Miguel Purugganan, former Bishop of the Diocese of Ilagan for the Church of Our Lady of the Visitation of Guibang to be called a National Shrine.
 Saint James the Apostle Parish Church (Santiago City)
 Poor Saint Clare Monastery (Gamu)
 Cathedral of Saint Michael the Archangel (Gamu)
 Our Lady of La Salette Parish Church (Roxas)
 Saint Joseph the Worker Parish Church (Echague)
 San Isidro Labrador Parish Church (San Isidro)
 San Roque Parish Church (The only Parish Church in the province that entrusted in the Missionaries of Our Lady of La Salette) (Ramon)

Festivals

Notable personalities

 General Mateo Noriel Luga - (Tumauini, Isabela) - War veteran/revolutionary
 Florence Finch — (Santiago, Isabela) — Filipino-American member of the World War II resistance against the Japanese occupation of the Philippines.
 Heherson Alvarez — (Santiago, Isabela) - former Senator and Secretary of Agrarian Reform
 Grace Padaca — former Governor of Isabela and former Commissioner of the Commission on Elections, recipient of the Ramon Magsaysay Award for Public Service in 2008.

 Bishop Miguel Purugganan - (Ilagan, Isabela) - Bishop of the Roman Catholic Diocese of Ilagan who protested the Human rights abuses of the Marcos dictatorship, and is honored at the Bantayog ng mga Bayani
 Freddie Aguilar — (Santo Tomas, Isabela) - Singer/composer

 Jejomar Binay — (Cabagan, Isabela) - 13th Vice President of the Republic of the Philippines
 Ruthlane Uy Asmundson — (Gamu, Isabela) - Mayor of Davis, California, USA
 Silvestre Bello III — (Ilagan, Isabela) - Secretary of the Department of Labor and Employment
 Gilbert Teodoro — former secretary of the Department of National Defense
 Michael Mangaoang - (Santiago City) - Singer
 Mutya Datul — (Santa Maria, Isabela) - Miss Supranational 2013 and Binibining Pilipinas - Supranational 2013

 Rogemar Menor — (Roxas, Isabela) - PBA Player
 Ricky Calimag — (Echague, Isabela) — PBA player
 Mark Telan — PBA Player
 Coco Martin — Actor/Singer

 MRLD

Notes

Further reading

 http://provinceofisabela.ph Official Website of the Province of Isabela. Retrieved October 3, 2014
 http://www.tourism.gov.ph/sitepages/FestivitiesList.aspx?festivityCode=292&monthCode=05 . Retrieved October 8, 2014
 http://www.philstar.com/nation/2014/02/01/1285254/isabelas-bambanti-festival-lures-thousands Bambanti Festival. Retrieved October 8, 2014
 http://provinceofisabela.ph/index.php?option=com_content&view=article&id=168&catid=95. Retrieved October 8, 2014
 http://provinceofisabela.ph/index.php/tourism/festivals?showall=&limitstart=. Retrieved October 8, 2014
 https://web.archive.org/web/20141014040136/http://www.rogerswebpoint.com/historyofcabatuan.htm Retrieved October 8, 2014
 http://www.spcicdtourism.com/#!festival/ccp2  Retrieved October 10, 2014
 http://www.manilatimes.net/renewable-energy-plant-to-rise-in-isabela/172957/ Renewable energy plant to rise in Isabela. Retrieved June 15, 2015
 https://web.archive.org/web/20150630234413/http://news.pia.gov.ph/article/view/481433287402/p7-b-solar-power-plant-to-rise-in-isabela P7-B solar power plant to rise in Isabela. Retrieved June 15, 2015
 http://newsinfo.inquirer.net/742119/construction-of-p2-28-b-road-thru-sierra-madre-starts-amid-protests#ixzz3xK3EqC2O  P2.28B road project for Ilagan-Divilacan Road Retrieved January 18, 2016

External links

 
 
 Philippine Standard Geographic Code

 
Provinces of the Philippines
Provinces of Cagayan Valley
States and territories established in 1856
1856 establishments in the Philippines